The National Premier Leagues Victoria Women, known commonly as the NPL Victoria Women's or NPLV Women's, is a professional women's association football league in Victoria, Australia. It is the highest league for women in Victoria, and has been a part of the National Premier Leagues Women’s structure, and which is administered by Football Victoria. Prior to the introduction of the NPL in Victoria in 2016, the league was known as the Women's Victorian Premier League. 

The league is contested by eleven clubs, playing a 22 round season, with the regular season running from February to September. The finals series is contested between the top four clubs, with the top two playing against third and fourth in a semi-final and the winners contesting the grand final.

WNPL Years (2016–present) 
The initial members of the WNPL were Alamein, Bayside United, Bulleen Lions, Box Hill United, Calder United, Heidelberg United, Geelong Galaxy United, Senior NTC and Southern United. In the following season, South Melbourne was admitted to the league who went on to win the inaugural Finals Series, 5–4 on penalties against Geelong Galaxy United. South Melbourne again made the Grand Final the following season losing 3–1 to Bulleen Lions. Despite not being crowned Champions, South Melbourne were successful in the regular season who were crowned Premiers of the 2018 season. This was a feat achieved by the club as well in their initial season in the renewed league. Calder United were crowned Grand Final Champions for the second time defeating Bulleen Lions 1–0. This was after Calder were crowned league champions prior to the finals series.

On the 27th of October, Football Victoria officially announced the league would be professionalised, scrapping the amateur nature of the league.

Current clubs (2023)
After the cancellation of both the 2020 season and the 2021 season due to the COVID-19 pandemic, it was decided that no promotion/relegation would apply for the following season. The following clubs will take part in the 2023 NPL Victoria Women's season:

Honours (NPL era)

Honours (Women's VPL era)

See also
 National Premier Leagues Victoria

References 

Women's soccer leagues in Australia
Soccer leagues in Victoria (Australia)